"Everybody Here Wants You" is the second track on the posthumous Sketches for My Sweetheart the Drunk album release by Jeff Buckley. It was written as a love song for Joan Wasser, his girlfriend at the time.  In October 2011, NME placed it at number 88 on its list "150 Best Tracks of the Past 15 Years". Kylie Auldist recorded a cover version with The Bamboos for the album Just Say (TRUCD159), as did the French band MIG (vocalist: Djazia Satour) on their 2004 album, Dhikrayat and Lewis Taylor on his 2000 album, Lewis II.  The single was nominated for Best Male Rock Vocal Performance at 41st Annual Grammy Awards in 1999.

Track listing
"Everybody Here Wants You"
"Thousand Fold"
"Eternal Life" (Road Version)
"Hallelujah" (live from the Bataclan)
"Last Goodbye" (live from Sydney)

The Australian version includes an interactive component (the same as that featured on other countries' versions of Sketches for My Sweetheart the Drunk)

References

Bibliography
Browne, David. Dream Brother: The Lives and Music of Jeff and Tim Buckley. HarperEntertainment. 2001, 2002.

1998 singles
Jeff Buckley songs
1996 songs
Columbia Records singles
Songs written by Jeff Buckley
American soul songs